The HTC Touch Cruise, also known as the HTC P3650 or its codename the HTC Polaris 100, is a Windows Mobile 6-powered Pocket PC. It is designed and manufactured by HTC and was first released in January 2008. In January 2009, HTC announced a completely redesigned device, also called the HTC Touch Cruise (or the HTC Touch Cruise (09); internal codename was Iolite). It was the first device to feature HTC Footprints.

Features

Features common to both versions 
 Connectivity
 Quad Band GSM / GPRS / EDGE: GSM 850, GSM 900, GSM 1800, GSM 1900
 Tri Band UMTS/HSDPA 850/1900/2100 MHz
 Wi-Fi 802.11b/g
 Bluetooth 2.0 w/EDR
 HTC ExtUSB (11-pin mini-USB & audio jack)
 Full speed USB 2.0
 FM radio
 GPS
 Memory
 Expansion slot for microSD (SD 2.0 compatible)
 Input
 Touchscreen and Stylus
 4-way navigation wheel with dual functionality as a scroll wheel with enter button.

2008 model 
 Memory
 256 MB Flash ROM
 128 MB DDR SDRAM

2009 model 
 Memory
 512 MB Flash ROM
 256 MB DDR SDRAM

See also 
 TouchFLO
 HTC Touch Family
 HTC

References

External links 
 HTC Touch Cruise specifications
 HTC Touch Cruise (09) product page

Touch Cruise
Windows Mobile Professional devices